Judge Stahl may refer to:

David Henry Stahl (1920–1970), judge of the United States Court of Appeals for the Third Circuit
Norman H. Stahl (born 1931), judge of the United States Court of Appeals for the First Circuit